Sebastjan Čelofiga (born 22 April 1983) is a Slovenian footballer who plays for Žalec.

Notes

External links
Profile at Prvaliga 

1983 births
Living people
Slovenian footballers
Association football goalkeepers
NK Celje players
NK Rudar Velenje players
NK IB 1975 Ljubljana players
Slovenian PrvaLiga players